Henry Morgan's Great Talent Hunt is a TV series on NBC Television hosted by Henry Morgan. The show aired from January 26 to June 1, 1951, originally from 9 p.m. to 9:30 p.m. ET and then to 9:30 p.m. to 10 p.m. ET.

Program formats
Henry Morgan's Great Talent Hunt began January 26, 1951, replacing Versatile Varieties. The first format for the Morgan show was a take-off on The Original Amateur Hour with Morgan as host, and featuring Kaye Ballard (in her TV debut), Art Carney, Pert Kelton, and Arnold Stang. The program "featured people who had unusual abilities", such as a man who picked a violin's strings with his teeth and a girl who played an instrument while tap dancing.

In April, NBC changed the title and format to The Henry Morgan Show, a music-variety show featuring singers Dorothy Claire and Dorothy Jarnac in musical segments between Morgan's comedy skits. This latter format lasted until June 1.

See also
1951-52 United States network television schedule

References

Bibliography
Alex McNeil, Total Television, Fourth edition (New York: Penguin Books, 1980) 
Tim Brooks and Earle Marsh, The Complete Directory to Prime Time Network TV Shows, Third edition (New York: Ballantine Books, 1964)

External links
Henry Morgan's Great Talent Hunt at IMDB

1950s American variety television series
1951 American television series debuts
1951 American television series endings
NBC original programming